Coastal Federal Credit Union is a not-for-profit, member-owned financial cooperative located in Raleigh, North Carolina. As of 2020, Coastal had $3.955 billion in assets and more than 278,000 members.

History
Established in August 1967, Coastal was formed through the efforts of eight employees of International Business Machines Corporation (IBM) to meet the financial needs of the local IBM community in Raleigh. In 1991, the field of membership was expanded to include employees of other businesses throughout certain North Carolina areas. Today, Coastal serves employees of more than 1,700 businesses and associations.

Coastal was a pioneer in the area of video banking, and in 2010 became the first institution in the world to convert 100 percent of its teller operations to video tellers.

Coastal operates 23 branches in central North Carolina and serves members in all 50 states through a network of 5,000 shared branches, 80,000 surcharge-free ATMs, mobile banking featuring mobile check deposit, and a robust offering of online services at www.COASTAL24.com.

External links

Official Coastal Federal Credit Union website

References

Banks established in 1967
Credit unions based in North Carolina
1967 establishments in North Carolina